Nanoprobing is method of extracting device electrical parameters through the use of nanoscale tungsten wires, used primarily in the semiconductor industry. The characterization of individual devices is instrumental to engineers and integrated circuit designers during initial product development and debug. It is commonly utilized in device failure analysis laboratories to aid with yield enhancement, quality and reliability issues and customer returns. Commercially available nanoprobing systems are integrated into either a vacuum-based scanning electron microscope (SEM) or atomic force microscope (AFM). Nanoprobing systems that are based on AFM technology are referred to as Atomic Force nanoProbers (AFP).

Principles and operation 
AFM based nanoprobers, enable up to eight probe tips to be scanned to generate high resolution AFM topography images, as well as Conductive AFM, Scanning Capacitance, and Electrostatic Force Microscopy images. Conductive AFM provides pico-amp resolution to identify and localize electrical failures such as shorts, opens, resistive contacts and leakage paths, enabling accurate probe positioning for current-voltage measurements. AFM based nanoprobers enable nanometer scale device defect localization and accurate transistor device characterization without the physical damage and electrical bias induced by high energy electron beam exposure.

For SEM based nanoprobers, the ultra-high resolution of the microscopes that house the nanoprobing system allow the operator to navigate the probe tips with precise movement, allowing the user to see exactly where the tips will be landed, in real time. Existing nanoprobe needles or “probe tips” have a typical end-point radius ranging from 5 to 35 nm. The fine tips enable access to individual contacts nodes of modern IC transistors. Navigation of the probe tips in SEM based nanoprobers are typically controlled by precision piezoelectric manipulators. Typical systems have anywhere from 2 to 8 probe manipulators with high end tools having better than 5 nm of placement resolution in the X, Y & Z axes and a high accuracy sample stage for navigation of the sample under test.

Application and capabilities for semiconductor devices 

Common nanoprobing techniques include, but are not limited to:
Conductive Atomic Force Microscopy (CAFM) - only available in AFM based tools
Scanning Capacitance Microscopy (SCM) - only available in AFM based tools
Electrostatic Force Microscopy (EFM) - only available in AFM based tools
DC transistor characterization (Id-Vg and Id-Vd Measurements)
Characterizing SRAM bitcells
BEOL Metal Resistance Measurements
Electron-Beam Absorbed Current Imaging (EBAC) - only available in SEM based tools

Challenges 

Common issues that arise:
Nanoprobe manipulator stability
Live image resolution
Maintaining probe conductivity
Chamber/Surface contamination

References 

Nanoprobe Capacitance-Voltage Spectroscopy (NCVS) Localization of 32nm SOI SRAM Array Failure

External links 
ASM International Symposium for Testing and Failure Analysis (ISTFA)
International Symposium on the Physical and Failure Analysis of Integrated Circuits (IPFA) 
SEM-based nanoprober
SEM-based shuttle nanoprober
Technical Papers on SEM-Based Nanoprober
Mobile robot based Nanoprober
Python scriptable Nanoprober

Electronic engineering
Nanoelectronics